Ferdinand William Hutchison ( – May 20, 1893) was a British physician and politician in the Kingdom of Hawaii who became a cabinet minister to King Kamehameha V. He was president of the Board of Health from 1868 to 1873 and was instrumental in the early development and management of the leper settlement of Kalaupapa. His surname is often misspelled as Hutchinson.

Life
Son of British Royal Navy Captain George Hutchison, he was born in Edinburgh and where he received his MRCS. He arrived in Hawaii around the early 1850. Prior to his rise to political prominence, he worked as a surgeon, magistrate, circuit judge and founded a sugar mill and became a prominent plantation owner. During the reign of King Kamehameha V, he was appointed as court physician. In 1865, he was appointed to succeed Charles Gordon Hopkins as Minister of the Interior, a position he held until 1873. He served briefly as Minister of Foreign Affairs in 1872 and 1873 and was a member of the House of Nobles, the upper house of the legislature, from 1866 to 1872. Writing in 1866, Mark Twain described Hutchison: 
He has sandy hair, sandy mustache, sandy complexion—is altogether one of the sandiest men I ever saw, so to speak: is a tall, stoop-shouldered, middle-aged, lowering-browed, intense-eyed, irascible man, and looks like he might have his little prejudices and partialities. He has got one good point, however — he don't talk.

Hutchison was also president of the Board of Health from 1868 to 1873 and was instrumental in the early development and management of the leper settlement of Kalaupapa on the island of Molokai. Previously as a board member, he had proposed the site as a place of exile after visiting the remote peninsula as a circuit judge. During his tenure as president, Hutchison adopted an economizing attitude to the conditions of the settlement and developed a bias toward the afflicted patients whom he regarded as amoral. One noted later exile was his own son Ambrose K. Hutchison, who was sent to the settlement on January 5, 1879, and became a superintendent of Kalaupapa from 1884 to 1897. His son never mentioned his father by name, possibly to shield him from the stigma of being related to a leper.

In the early 1850s, while working as a port physician in Lahaina, Ferdinand William Hutchison married Maria or Malie Moa, a Native Hawaiian woman, who was the first of three wives. They had three children: Ambrose K. Hutchison, William Hutchison and Christina Hutchison, who were given to relatives to be raised after their mother's death. His son William had eleven children including a son he named Ambrose Ferdinand after the child's uncle and grandfather. In 1875, Hutchison moved to Australia taking his daughter Christina with him. He died at his residence, in Leichhardt, Sydney on May 20, 1893, at the age of seventy-four, after a long illness.

References

Bibliography

External links

1819 births
1893 deaths
Hawaiian Kingdom politicians
Hawaiian Kingdom Interior Ministers
Members of the Hawaiian Kingdom House of Nobles
Hawaiian Kingdom judges
19th-century British medical doctors
Politicians from Edinburgh
Politicians from Sydney
British expatriates in the Hawaiian Kingdom
Members of the Hawaii Board of Health